All Kerala M.G.R. Dravida Munnetra Party is a political party working amongst the Tamil minority in the Indian state of Kerala. It was formed as a split from All India Anna Dravida Munnetra Kazhagam and supported the widow of M.G. Ramachandran, Janaki Ramachandran.

Political parties in Kerala
Memorials to M G Ramachandran
Political parties with year of establishment missing